Más Para Dar, is the twenty-seventh (27th) studio album by Puerto Rican singer Yolandita Monge and her first release in over four years. This album was released on November 13, 2012.  It contains nine new songs co-written by Yolandita Monge, being the first time in the singer's career that she composes for an entire album.  This release follows the same musical and lyrical style as her previous studio albums Demasiado Fuerte and Mala and was produced once again by Jose Luis Pagán.  

The album is a balanced effort, one that mixes pop and rock with the instant highlights "Ahora Vivo Si Tu Amor" and the electro-fueled single "Vivo Por Tí", which get a moving acoustic reading later in the album.  "Desde Que Te Perdí" is both a slow builder and slow burner, with layers of guitars and strings supporting Monge's expressive and powerful voice.  "Verás Dolor" and "Y Aquí Me Ves De Pie" prove that the singer's emotional delivery is better than ever.   The title track "Más Para Dar" is a beautiful song about second chances in love and life.   

This albums finds Monge going the indie route by releasing it in her own imprint, Roma Entertainment, and it is available as a digital download at iTunes and Amazon.

Track listing

Personnel
Vocals: Yolandita Monge
Keyboards: José Luis Pagán
Bass: Victor Sierra
Guitar: José Luis Pagán
Drums: Paul Vottler, Hernan Marchesi
Percussion: Daniel Rotundo

Production
Producer: José Luis Pagán
Mastering: Sound Nuts Studios by Diego Acosta
Recorded and Mixed: Ultra Pop Studios, Sound Nuts Studios by José Luis Pagán and Diego Acosta
Photography and graphic designs: Eric Stella
Stylist: Mayra Moreno
Makeup: Mayra Moreno

Notes

Track listing and credits from album booklet.

Charts

Tour

Más Para Dar Tour (also referred to as Más Para Dar El Concierto) is the concert tour by Yolandita Monge in support of her studio album Más Para Dar. Beginning in the Dominican Republic, this concert tour will visit cities in the United States, Puerto Rico and Latin America. In the concerts at Santo Domingo, Yolandita will share stage with Danny Rivera.

Setlist

Tour dates

Cancellations and rescheduled shows

References

Yolandita Monge albums